Çağan Irmak (born 4 April 1970) is a Turkish film and television writer and director, who has managed to attract a large audience in Turkey and is best known for the TV series Çemberimde Gül Oya (2004–2005) and Asmalı Konak (2002–2004), and for the hit films Alone (2008) and My Father and My Son (2005), for which he received Turkish Cinema Writers Association Awards for Best Film, Best Screenplay and Best Director.

He studied Radio, TV and Film Studies at Ege University Faculty of Communications, receiving the Sedat Simavi  Award for two short films, Masal (The Tale) and Kurban (The Sacrifice), which he made in the course of his studies. After graduating in 1992, he worked in cinema and television as an assistant director to Orhan Oğuz, Mahinur Ergun, Filiz Kaynak and Yusuf Kurçenli, and was awarded first prize by IFSAK for his short film Play Me Old and Wise (1998).

He wrote and directed the TV series Good Morning Brother Istanbul (1998–2001) on atv, and the TV film Strawberry Cake (2000) before achieving some early success with his first feature film, Wish Me Luck (2001), which Rekin Teksoy describes as "unremarkable", and collaborations with Mahinur Ergun on the hit TV series Şaşıfelek Çıkmazı (2001) for TRT, and Asmalı Konak (2002–2004) for atv, for which he received numerous awards.

A period of great success followed with popular TV series Çemberimde Gül Oya (2004–2005) on Kanal D, and hit films Everything About Mustafa (2004) and My Father and My Son (2005), which according to Rekin Teksoy "successfully exploited the melodramatic idiom and was a huge box-office success," which, "showed that popular cinema was successful in appealing to wide audiences" as well as receiving six Turkish Cinema Writers Association Awards including Best Director.

Following this he wrote and directed several installment in the TV horror film series Kabuslar Evi for FOX, and the film The Messenger before achieving another popular success with the film Alone (2008). Since then he has made the short film Düşlerimdeki Atatürk (2008), the TV series Yol Arkadaşım (2008–2009) for Star and the film In Darkness (2009). He has been productive in the last years and has produced 4 additional films: Sleeping Princess (2010), My Grandfather's People (2011), Are We OK? (2012) and Whisper If I Forget (2014).

Filmography

References

External links
 

1970 births
Turkish film directors
Turkish male screenwriters
People from Seferihisar
Living people